Kleve is a town in North Rhine-Westphalia, Germany.

Kleve may also refer to other places in Germany:

Kleve (district), a local government district in northwestern North Rhine-Westphalia
Kleve (electoral district), a Bundestag electoral constituency in North Rhine-Westphalia
Kleve station, a railway station in the town of Kleve
Kleve (region), a government region of the Prussian Province of Jülich-Cleves-Berg 1815–1822
Kleve, Dithmarschen, a municipality in the district of Dithmarschen, Schleswig-Holstein
Kleve, Steinburg, a municipality in the district of Steinburg, Schleswig-Holstein

See also
Cleve (disambiguation)
Cleeve (disambiguation)
Cleave (disambiguation)